SAPO or Sapo may refer to:

Places
 Sapo National Park, a national park in Sinoe County, Liberia
 Mount Sapo, a mountain in Cochabamba Department, Bolivia
 Mount Sapo, a mountain in Darién Province, Panama

Organisations
 Swedish Security Service (SÄPO)
 SAPO (company) (Serviço de Apontadores Portugueses Online), a Portuguese Internet service provider
 South African Port Operations, the port management subsidiary of Transnet
 South African Post Office, postal service provider in South Africa
 Specialized Anti-Corruption Prosecutor's Office, a Ukrainian governmental agency

Other uses
 SAPO, a silico-alumino-phosphate, a type of zeotype material or molecular sieve, related to zeolites 
 SAPO (computer), the first Czechoslovak computer
 Sapo language, a Niger-Congo language of Liberia
 Mount Sapo, fictitious mountain in Italy
 Sapo, Portuguese guitar player for rock band Mão Morta
 sapo, a bar game in South America similar to toad in the hole